Lieutenant General Clovis Ethelbert Byers (November 5, 1899 – December 13, 1973) was a United States Army officer who served in the first half of the 20th century. He is best known for his role as Chief of Staff of the Eighth Army in the South West Pacific Area during World War II and in the occupation of Japan. He was wounded while leading American troops from the front at the Battle of Buna-Gona, and also played an important part in the fighting at Lone Tree Hill, Biak, and the Philippines campaign (1944–45).

After the war, he commanded the famous 82nd "All American" Airborne Division before going on to command X Corps in the Korean War and, as such, was in overall command at the Battle of Heartbreak Ridge and the Battle of Bloody Ridge.

Education and early life

Clovis Ethelbert Byers was born in Columbus, Ohio, on November 5, 1899. He entered the United States Military Academy (USMA) at West Point, New York, in 1916. He attended Ohio State University in Columbus from 1917 to 1918 before graduating from West Point from June 15, 1920. He was commissioned as a Second Lieutenant in the cavalry on July 2, 1920.

Byers attended the United States Army Cavalry School at Fort Riley, Kansas, from 1920 to 1921. He was posted to the 4th Cavalry at Fort Brown and later Fort McIntosh, Texas, where he commanded Troop D until it was inactivated in 1923. He attended the Signal School at Fort Monmouth from 1923 to 1924 and then became regimental communications officer of 3rd Cavalry at Fort Myer. In 1925 he was promoted to First Lieutenant.

In March 1926, Byers became an instructor in tactics at the United States Military Academy. He was Assistant Master of the Sword and then Master of the Sword until 1930.

He was a Student Officer at the Special Advanced Equitation Course at United States Army Cavalry School from 1930 to 1931 and then served with the 8th Cavalry Regiment at Fort Bliss from 1931 to 1932. After this, Byers returned to West Point as a tactics instructor, and then as Assistant Adjutant from 1932 to 1934.

From 1934 to 1936 Byers attended the Command and General Staff College, where he was finally promoted to Captain on August 1, 1935. On completing the course, he was assigned to the staff of the 2nd Division at Fort Sam Houston. In October 1936, he became Aide-de-Camp to Major General Herbert J. Brees, commander of the VIII Corps area. Byers then joined the 5th Cavalry at Fort Bliss, where he commanded Troop A from 1937 to 1938 and the 1st Squadron from 1938 to 1939.

He married Marie Richards (1900–1984) of Columbus, Ohio. They had one son, Clayton Potter Byers, who was born on June 23, 1940.

World War II
Byers spent for months visiting military schools in England, France, and Germany prior to attending the U.S. Army War College from September 1939 to June 1940. He was promoted to major on July 1, 1940. On graduation he was assigned to the G-1 (Personnel) Division, War Department General Staff at a time when the workload of this division was particularly heavy owing to the vast expansion of the Army. He was promoted to wartime rank Lieutenant Colonel on December 11, 1941, and Colonel on February 1, 1942.

In February 1942, Byers became Chief of Staff of Major General Robert L. Eichelberger's newly reactivated 77th Infantry Division at Fort Jackson, South Carolina. Byers would form a close working relationship with Eichelberger, who had also attended Ohio State where he too had been a member of the Phi Gamma Delta fraternity.
Byers, along with a number of other staff members from the 77th Infantry Division, followed Eichelberger when the latter became commander of I Corps in June 1942.

The I Corps headquarters staff moved to Brisbane by air in August 1942, travelling on the same aircraft as former United States Secretary of War Patrick J. Hurley and the Prime Minister of New Zealand, Peter Fraser. The headquarters soon moved to Rockhampton, Queensland, where it supervised the training of American troops in Queensland.

Byers was promoted to temporary Brigadier General on October 31, 1942.

Papuan campaign

When the Battle of Buna-Gona started going badly, General Douglas MacArthur, the Supreme Commander, South West Pacific Area, decided to send I Corps headquarters to the front in Papua. Eichelberger recalled Macarthur's instructions:

In accordance with MacArthur's orders, Eichelberger relieved the 32nd Infantry Division's commander, Major General Edwin F. Harding, replacing him with the division's artillery commander, Brigadier General Albert W. Waldron, on December 2, 1942. In an attack on December 5, Waldron was shot in the shoulder by a Japanese sniper, and Byers succeeded him as commander of the troops in the field. Byers in turn was wounded on December 16. He became the third American general to be shot at Buna, Brigadier General Hanford MacNider having been shot earlier in the fighting, none of whom was more than 75 metres from Japanese lines at the time. General Eichelberger assumed command, as he was now the only American general officer present. Waldron and Byers were awarded the Distinguished Service Cross. Byers' citation read:

For his role in the fighting in Papua, Byers also received the Silver Star and Purple Heart. In turn, Byers recommended Eichelberger for the Medal of Honor but the nomination was disapproved by MacArthur. Byers returned to the front on January 17, 1943, as Chief of Staff of Advance New Guinea Force, now commanded by Eichelberger. The two remained until January 26, when they returned to Australia.

New Guinea campaign
I Corps headquarters remained at Rockhampton, Queensland, in the training role until March 1944, when it moved to Goodenough Island, where it prepared and staged for Operations RECKLESS and PERSECUTION. For his part in the operation, Byers was awarded the Bronze Star. His citation read:

Byers was awarded an Oak Leaf Cluster to his Silver Star in the Battle of Biak. His citation read:

He was also awarded an Oak Leaf Cluster to his Bronze Star Medal. This citation read:

Lieutenant General Walter Krueger, commander of the Sixth Army offered to make Byers an assistant division commander. When Byers refused the offer, Krueger took this as a personal affront.

In August 1944, Eighth Army headquarters arrived in the New Guinea and Eichelberger became commander of the new army. Once again, Byers followed him as his chief of staff. For his services as Chief of Staff of I Corps, Byers was awarded the Legion of Merit:

Philippines campaign
Byers remained Chief of Staff through the Eighth Army's operations on Leyte and Luzon, for which Byers was awarded a second oak leaf cluster to his Bronze Star Medal:

The Eighth Army proceeded to complete the reconquest of the Philippines with the Visayas and Mindanao campaigns. For his part, Byers was awarded the Army Distinguished Service Medal. According to his citation, Byers:

He was also awarded the Air Medal:

Byers was promoted to the temporary rank of major general on June 4, 1945, with his date of rank backdated to December 1, 1944.

Occupation of Japan
After hostilities ended, the Eighth Army participated in the Occupation of Japan. Byers landed at Atsugi aerodrome with the 11th Airborne Division on August 30, 1945. Eichelberger remained Eighth Army commander and Byers his Chief of Staff until Eichelberger retired in 1948. For his services in Japan, Byers was awarded an Oak Leaf Cluster to his Legion of Merit:

Korean War

On returning to the United States in 1948, Byers became commander of the 82nd Airborne Division at Fort Bragg, North Carolina. In 1949, he returned to Washington, D.C. as Deputy Assistant Army Chief of Staff G-1 (Personnel).

In July 1951, Byers replaced Major General Edward Almond as commander of X Corps, then engaged in combat in Korea. As such, Byers was in overall command at the Battle of Heartbreak Ridge and the Battle of Bloody Ridge.

Later life
Byers became commander of XVI Corps in 1952. He served as Chief of Staff of Allied Forces Southern Europe (AFSOUTH) from 1952 to 1954 and then commander of X Corps again. He was Deputy Commandant of the National War College from 1954 to 1955 and then Commandant of the NATO Defence College from 1955 to 1957.

Byers was promoted to the substantive rank of Brigadier General, United States Army in 1948, Major General in 1952, and Lieutenant General in 1955.

Byers retired from the army in June 1959. He died on December 13, 1973, and is buried with his wife Marie  in Arlington National Cemetery. His papers are in the Hoover Institution.

References

Notes

External links

 Clovis Ethelbert Byers at ArlingtonCemetery.net, an unofficial website
Generals of World War II

United States Army Cavalry Branch personnel
Burials at Arlington National Cemetery
Honorary Commanders of the Order of the British Empire
Officiers of the Légion d'honneur
Ohio State University alumni
People from Columbus, Ohio
Recipients of the Distinguished Service Cross (United States)
Recipients of the Distinguished Service Medal (US Army)
Recipients of the Silver Star
Recipients of the Legion of Merit
Recipients of the Military Merit Medal (Philippines)
United States Military Academy alumni
1899 births
1973 deaths
United States Army Command and General Staff College alumni
Recipients of the Air Medal
United States Army generals of World War II
United States Army generals